Shane Cullinan is a composer, arranger and lyricist whose work ranges from compositions for TV and film to orchestral dramas and opera.

Life and career
Cullinan has worked independently as a composer and arranger since graduating from Nottingham Trent University.

His focus for composition for string quartet came in the form of a residency at Princeton University, New Jersey and featured on his first commercial recording, Y=-X2. His film credits include the music to Insight In Mind, The Nuclear Train and The Silent Train, all for Channel 4. His score to Insight In Mind, a short film about mental illness, was screened at the National Film Theatre, London, in 2003.

His first orchestral drama, The Pieta, had its world premiere in St James's Church, Piccadilly, London in May 2009, featuring actor Frances Barber as the narrator with a subsequent cast recording being commercially released through Cayos Records.<ref>The work was revived for a performance at Royal Northern College of Music in 2017

The text and score to his work The Magpie was the inspiration behind the play, Dirty Pretty Secrets, which premiered at the Edinburgh Festival Fringe in 2004.

Cullinan works with his orchestral collective, Tonic Fold, who have released three albums since 2002. They include Numbers Rush By which was released in January 2008 and won the Overplay Songwriters Award 2008 and was shortlisted for the UK Songwriters Awards 2008.

His album, The Violent Language of Portraits, features guest artists Kathy Burke, David McAlmont, Chris New, Rachel Tucker and Tom Parsons and is being released in late 2012.

Cullinan has continued to work for theatre and film and on projects with the Royal Opera House, The Urban Culture Project, Tonic Fold, Cargem Theatre, Hanby & Barrett, and Channel 4. In 2017 he was appointed as composer and musical director for the prolific West-End production of Lady Windermere's Fan directed by Kathy Burke starring Jennifer Saunders, Samantha Spiro, Kevin Bishop and Joseph Marcell, produced by Dominic Dromgoole Classic Spring Company at Vaudeville Theatre London.

Discography

Albums
 Y=-X2 - Shane Cullinan (EP)
 The Beachcomber - Shane Cullinan (1997)
 Letter to East - Shane Cullinan (1999)
 Demonstration – Shane Cullinan (2000)
 The Run - Tonic Fold (2002) (EP)
 The Magdalens - Tonic Fold (2003)
 Numbers Rush By – Tonic Fold (2007)
 The Pieta - Shane Cullinan (2009)
 The Violent Language of Portraits - Tonic Fold (2013)

Theatre
 Lady Windermere's Fan, Director Kathy Burke, Vaudeville Theatre London
 The Acid Circus, Castlegate Hall in Nottingham and Town Hall Manchester
 Dirty Pretty Secrets, Edinburgh Festival Fringe
 Anthony on a Bench on a Hill, in pre-production

Opera
 Tacitly Type Tabes, Bonnington Gallery, Nottingham
 The Pieta, St James's Church, Piccadilly, London & RNCM Manchester

Film/TV
 Becca's Earth (Soundtrap/Channel 4 pilot)
 The Nuclear Train (Channel 4, Animate! series)
 Insight In Mind (Swings And Roundabouts in association with Arts Council England)

Discography

Albums
Y=-X2 - Shane Cullinan (1997) (EP)
The Beachcomber - Shane Cullinan (1997)
Letter to East - Shane Cullinan (1999)
Demonstration – Shane Cullinan (2000)
The Run - Tonic Fold (2002) (EP)
The Magdalens - Tonic Fold (2003)
Numbers Rush By – Tonic Fold (2007)
The Pieta - Shane Cullinan (2009)
The Violent Language of Portraits - Tonic Fold (2013)

Theatre
The Acid Circus, Castlegate Hall in Nottingham and Town Hall Manchester, 1998
Dirty Pretty Secrets, Edinburgh Festival Fringe, 2008
Anthony on a Bench on a Hill, in pre-production, 2013
Up The Garden Path, in collaboration with Tim Benzie and Paul Joseph, in pre-production, 2013

Opera
Tacitly Type Tabes, Bonnington Gallery, Nottingham, 1999
The Pieta, St James's Church, Piccadilly, London, 2008

Film/TV
Becca's Earth (Soundtrap/Channel 4 pilot), 2006 
The Nuclear Train (Channel 4, Animate! series), 2004
Insight In Mind (Swings And Roundabouts in association with Arts Council England), 2003

External links
 Shane Cullinan's official website
 Shane Cullinan on Soundcloud
 The Times Interview
 Review of The Pieta
 Review of Tonic Fold

References

1975 births
British composers
Alumni of Nottingham Trent University
Living people